Thomas J. Ferraro is an American non-fiction writer, and Frances Hill Fox Professor of English at Duke University.

Life
He graduated summa cum laude from Amherst College, and earned his Ph.D. at
Yale University, where he took the Theron Rockwell Field Prize for Distinguished Humanities Dissertation.
He teaches American literature and cultural studies at Duke University, with a special emphasis on Catholicity, immigrant literature, and visual media.

Awards
 2006 American Book Award, for Feeling Italian: the art of ethnicity in America
 2010, Alumni Distinguished Undergraduate Teaching Award, Duke's most prestigious undergraduate teaching award
 2011, Bass Society of Fellows, endowed chair in English for excellence in scholarship and pedagogy

Works

Editor

References

External links
"Where We Live: Getting Back to Our Roots", Connecticut Public Broadcasting Network, 01/30/2009

American male writers
Amherst College alumni
Yale University alumni
Duke University faculty
Year of birth missing (living people)
Living people
American Book Award winners